J. B. Judkins was an American lawyer and politician in Arkansas. He was elected to the state senate in 1880. In 1883 he was elected president of the senate. He was a lawyer in Black Rock, Arkansas.

References

Year of birth missing
Year of death missing
Arkansas state senators
Arkansas lawyers
19th-century American politicians
19th-century American lawyers
People from Lawrence County, Arkansas